Burdwan Dental College and Hospital (BDCH) is a government dental college located in Burdwan, in the Indian state of West Bengal. It is affiliated with the West Bengal University of Health Sciences and is recognized by Dental Council of India.  It offers Bachelor of Dental Science (BDS).

References

Dental colleges in India
Universities and colleges in Purba Bardhaman district
2009 establishments in West Bengal